Zea is an EP by Belgian rock band Deus. It was first released in June 1993. This EP was released prior to the group's contract with Island Records.

Track listing
 "Intro Zea Replica" – 0:37
 "Zea" – 5:00
 "Right as Rain" – 4:31
 "Great American Nude" – 5:38

Jack & Johnny Edition
 "Zea" – 5:38
 "Right As Rain" – 4:31
 "Great American Nude" – 5:38

References

External links
EP Information

1993 EPs
Deus (band) albums